Clyzomedus annularis is a species of beetle in the family Cerambycidae. It was described by Francis Polkinghorne Pascoe in 1866. It is known from Cambodia, the Andaman Islands, Malaysia, Laos, and the Nicobar Islands.

References

Mesosini
Beetles described in 1866